The Pitinga River is a river of Amazonas state in north-western Brazil. It empties into the Balbina Dam on the Uatumã River.

Mining operation

In the 1970s the Amazon Radar Project detected deposits of cassiterite (tin ore) on the Waimiri Atroari Indigenous Reservation.
Prospectors of Mineração Taboca, a subsidiary of the Paranapanema heavy civil construction company, found traces of cassiterite in 1979 in tributaries of the Pitinga River.
The Pitinga mine began operations in 1982.
The company built a community in the Amazon forest  from Manaus with housing, schools, health facilities, power and telecommunications.
In 1985 Paranapanema invested US$15 million in infrastructure upgrades, including a 10,000 kilowatt hydroelectric power plant on the Pitinga River, expected to reduce energy costs by US$4 million annually.

See also
List of rivers of Amazonas

References

Sources

Rivers of Amazonas (Brazilian state)